This is a list of Storage Wars episodes that have aired on the A&E network over the course of its run. A 14th season premiered on November 2, 2021.

Series overview

Episodes list

Season 1 (2010–2011)

Season 2 (2011–2012)

Season 3 (2012–2013)

Season 4 (2013)

Season 5 (2014)

Season 6 (2014–2015)

Season 7 (2015)
 Auctioneers: Dan & Laura Dotson
 Buyers: Dave Hester, Jarrod Schulz & Brandi Passante, Darrell & Brandon Sheets, Rene & Casey Nezhoda, Ivy Calvin, and Mary Padian

Season 8 (2015)
 Auctioneers: Dan & Laura Dotson
 Buyers: Dave Hester, Jarrod Schulz & Brandi Passante, Darrell & Brandon Sheets, Rene & Casey Nezhoda, Ivy Calvin, and Mary Padian

Season 9 (2016)
 Auctioneers: Dan & Laura Dotson
 Buyers: Dave Hester, Jarrod Schulz & Brandi Passante, Darrell & Brandon Sheets, Rene & Casey Nezhoda, Ivy Calvin, and Mary Padian

Season 10 (2017)
 Auctioneers: Dan & Laura Dotson, Emily Wears
 Buyers: Dave Hester, Jarrod Schulz & Brandi Passante, Darrell & Chad Sheets, Rene & Casey Nezhoda, Ivy Calvin, Mary Padian, and Kenny Crossley

Season 11 (2017–2018)
 Auctioneers: Dan & Laura Dotson, Emily Wears
 Buyers: Dave Hester, Jarrod Schulz & Brandi Passante, Darrell & Chad Sheets, Rene & Casey Nezhoda, Ivy Calvin, Mary Padian, Kenny Crossley, Shana Dahan & Edwina Registre, and Justin Bryant

Season 12 (2018–2019)
 Auctioneers: Dan & Laura Dotson, Emily Wears
 Buyers: Dave Hester, Jarrod Schulz & Brandi Passante, Darrell & Chad Sheets, Rene & Casey Nezhoda, Ivy Calvin, Mary Padian, Kenny Crossley, Shana Dahan & Edwina Registre, and Justin Bryant

Season 13 (2021)
 Auctioneers: Dan & Laura Dotson
 Buyers: Jarrod Schulz, Brandi Passante, Darrell Sheets, Rene & Casey Nezhoda, Ivy Calvin, Kenny Crossley, Lisa Delarios

Season 14 (2021–2022)
 Auctioneers: Dan & Laura Dotson
 Buyers: Brandi Passante, Darrell Sheets, Rene & Casey Nezhoda, Ivy Calvin, Kenny Crossley, Barry Weiss, Lisa Delarios and Dusty Riach

References

External links
 

Lists of American reality television series episodes
Episodes
Lists of American non-fiction television series episodes